Cypress Hills may refer to:

Places
Cypress Hills, Brooklyn, a neighborhood in Brooklyn, New York, United States
Cypress Hills (Canada), a region in the provinces of Alberta and Saskatchewan, Canada
Cypress Hills Interprovincial Park, located in Cypress Hills, Canada
Cypress Hills (electoral district), a provincial electoral district for the Legislative Assembly of Saskatchewan, Canada
Cypress Hills—Grasslands, electoral district
Cypress Hills Formation, landform

Other uses
Cypress Hills station, a New York City Subway station
Cypress Hills Cemetery, a non-sectarian cemetery located in Brooklyn
Cypress Hills National Cemetery, a United States National Cemetery located in Brooklyn
Cypress Hills, the name for public housing that is on the border of  New Lots and the City Line, Brooklyn neighborhoods
Cypress Hills Massacre

See also
Cypress Hill, a hip-hop band